Hope is a CD single by jazz pianist Toshiko Akiyoshi and singer Monday Michiru released in Japan on the Nippon Crown Record label.  The instrumental version of the song "Hope" is from the 2006 Akiyoshi album of the same name.  The composition "Hope" is the closing section of Akiyoshi's "Hiroshima: Rising from the Abyss" suite, first introduced on the 2001 Toshiko Akiyoshi Jazz Orchestra album, Hiroshima - Rising From The Abyss.

Formats and track listing
CD single CRCP-10157
"Hope" – 3:37 (Japanese lyrics)
"Hope" – 3:30 (English lyrics)
"Hope" – 3:11 (instrumental version from the 2006 Toshiko Akiyoshi album Hope)

"Hope" composed by Toshiko Akiyoshi, Japanese Lyrics by Shuntarō Tanikawa, English translation by Monday Michiru.

Personnel
Toshiko Akiyoshi – piano
Monday Michiru – vocal (tracks 1, 2)

References / External links
Nippon Crown Records, Japan CRCP-10157

Toshiko Akiyoshi songs
2006 singles
2006 songs